The Junior School Certificate (JSC) is a public examination taken by students in Bangladesh after successful completion of eight years of schooling. It is followed by the Secondary School Certificate (SSC).

Before the JSC was introduced, an exam was taken in its place (then known as Madhyamik Britti or Junior Scholarship). This was a voluntary vocational exam and not mandatory.

Since 2012, the JSC exam questions have consisted of multiple (between 6 and 11, of which 4 to 7 sets need to be answered) sets of four questions, each requiring the student to have knowledge, understanding, application and higher order thinking skills regarding the subject matter to solve. This system has been termed as creative (locally called Srijonshil) questions. It is said that JSC was also introduced so that the poor and destitute people of the country could do well on the exam. Examinees, if they fail, are allowed to retake the exam with other regular examinees in the following year.

Mark distribution system 

The Education Boards of Bangladesh have provided the result based on GPA (grade point average), which depends on each subject average grade point (GP). 90 marks will count as GP 4.00 and 80 marks will count as GP 3.50. For better understanding, the marks distribution chart is provided below.

See also 
Secondary School Certificate (SSC)
Higher Secondary (School) Certificate (HSC)
General Certificate of Secondary Education (GCSE)

References

 Secondary education in Bangladesh